Gary Kurfirst (8 July 1947 – 13 January 2009) was an American music promoter, producer, manager, publisher, and record label executive. Kurfirst founded Radioactive Records, whose acts included Live, Black Grape, Ramones, Big Audio Dynamite, Talking Heads, Eurythmics and Shirley Manson. He managed a variety of artists including Manson, Blondie, Tom Tom Club, the Ramones, Jean Beauvoir, Eurythmics, Bob Marley and the Wailers, Toots and the Maytals, and The B-52s.

Early years
Kurfirst was born in Forest Hills, Queens. He started promoting dances while he was still a student at Forest Hills High School in Queens. He rapidly moved on to organizing and promoting shows at the tennis stadium at the West Side Tennis Club in Forest Hills and moving across the East River to promoting gigs in Manhattan. Kurfirst helped arrange the first East Coast performances of acts including Jimi Hendrix and The Who.

Career
He established the Village Theater in the East Village at Second Avenue at Sixth Street in 1967, which a year later became the Fillmore East under the management of promoter Bill Graham. In August 1968, Kurfist organized the New York Rock Festival at the Singer Bowl in Flushing Meadow Park, an open-air concert with 18,000 in attendance that featured performances by The Chambers Brothers, The Doors, Jimi Hendrix, Janis Joplin and the Soft Machine. In his obituary, The New York Times credited Kurfirst's success at the New York Rock Festival with inspiring the creation of the Woodstock Festival in Bethel, New York in August 1969.

While negotiating a contract for the group Mountain in the late 1960s, Kurfirst developed a close relationship with Chris Blackwell, his counterpart at Island Records. Blackwell, quoted in Kurfirst's obituary in The New York Times, described him as "one of the first managers who basically built the rock business", stating that Kurfirst "stayed below the radar and once refused the cover of Rolling Stone because he felt it was not the right time for his band".

Kurfirst managed reggae artists The Wailers founder Peter Tosh and Toots & the Maytals. His reach spanned new wave, reggae, punk, rock and pop. His client list as manager included the Ramones, Blondie, Talking Heads, Tom Tom Club, the B-52's, Eurythmics, Jane's Addiction, Holly and the Italians and Shirley Manson (Angelfish).

Films
Kurfirst also produced four films, including Siesta, Stop Making Sense, True Stories and a documentary about the Ramones.

Death
Kurfirst died at age 61 on January 13, 2009, while he was vacationing in the Bahamas.

References

External links 

1947 births
2009 deaths
American music managers
Record producers from New York (state)
People from Forest Hills, Queens
Forest Hills High School (New York) alumni
Music promoters